Traykovo is a village in Northwestern Bulgaria.
It is located in Lom Municipality, Montana Province.

It is situated 10 km southwest of the town of Lom, 49 km north of Montana and about 150 km in the same direction from Sofia.

See also
List of villages in Montana Province

References

Villages in Montana Province